Shooting the Moon is a 1998 Italian drama film directed by Francesca Archibugi. It entered the competition at the 59th Venice International Film Festival, in which Niccolò Senni won the Marcello Mastroianni Award.

Cast 
Valeria Golino: Silvia
Sergio Rubini: Massimo
Stefano Dionisi: Roberto
Niccolò Senni: Siddharta
Francesca Di Giovanni: Domitilla
Victor Cavallo: Coso

References

External links

1998 films
Films directed by Francesca Archibugi
Films set in Rome
1990s coming-of-age drama films
Italian coming-of-age drama films
Films about dysfunctional families
1998 drama films
1990s Italian films